The House Subcommittee on Nutrition, Foreign Agriculture and Horticulture is a subcommittee within the House Agriculture Committee. Previously known as the Subcommittee on Nutrition, its duties were greatly expanded in the 118th Congress to cover foreign agriculture, international trade, horticulture and plant-based agriculture.

It is currently chaired by Republican Brad Finstad of Minnesota.

Jurisdiction
Policies, statutes, and markets relating to horticulture, including fruits, vegetables, nuts, and ornamentals; bees; and organic agriculture; policies and statutes relating to marketing and promotion orders; policies and statutes relating to nutrition, including the Supplemental Nutrition Assistance Program and domestic commodity distribution and consumer initiative; policies and statutes related to foreign agricultural assistance and trade promotion; and related oversight of such issues.

Members, 118th Congress

Historical membership rosters

117th Congress

116th Congress

115th Congress

Notes

References

External links
Subcommittee page

Agriculture Nutrition